The Dirty Thirty scandal took place between 1992 and 1995 in the New York City Police Department's Thirtieth Precinct, serving Harlem, and was the largest collection of police officers charged with corruption in New York City in almost a decade. A group of rogue officers, led by Sergeant Kevin P. Nannery, participated in various unlawful activities, including civil rights conspiracy, perjury, extortion, grand larceny and the possession and distribution of narcotics. The scandal led to a number of arrests of police officers and two suicides.

Background
The "Dirty 30" were mostly stationed at the 30th Precinct in Harlem, Upper Manhattan. At the time, the area was known as the “cocaine capital of the world” to locals and law enforcement. 
Police corruption was extremely high around this time, and the Mollen Commission was created to help investigate and eradicate corruption within the NYPD. Corruption was so bad that although many supervising officers did not participate, they turned blind eyes to other officers committing unlawful acts.

Nannery's Raiders
Sergeant Kevin Nannery took the extra step and began participating. Soon his group of officers began calling themselves "Nannery's Raiders", and participated in "booming" – making bogus radio calls to cover up illegal search and seizures on known drug dealers' apartments, where they seized drugs and stole large amounts of cash. They would then sell the seized drugs straight from the 30th Precinct itself at half-market price in order to profit from their spoils.

In one case, the sergeant and two officers stopped a man in an apartment complex, took his keys and then ransacked his apartment without a warrant. They let the man go after taking several thousand dollars worth of drugs and cash. They also participated in various extortions, with illegal drug wholesalers giving the officers weekly payoffs that ranged anywhere from $600–1,000 a week.

Investigation and arrests
In 1993, Dirty 30 officer "Otto", a.k.a. Barry Brown went undercover in an investigation against the Dirty 30. The two-year investigation included sting and surveillance operations. On the week of Sept 28, 1994, 29 police officers were arrested, with five pleading guilty. A total of 33 officers were arrested. The perjury committed by these officers also resulted in at least 50 of their cases being dismissed.

Officers and charges

See also 
 Crime in Harlem

References 

1992 in New York City
1993 in New York City
1994 in New York City
1995 in New York City
Law enforcement scandals
New York City Police Department corruption and misconduct